1032 Pafuri, provisional designation , is a dark background asteroid from the outer regions of the asteroid belt, approximately  in diameter. It was discovered on 30 May 1924, by English astronomer Harry Edwin Wood at the Union Observatory in Johannesburg, South Africa. The asteroid was named for the river in the Pafuri Triangle in South Africa, created by the confluence of the Limpopo and Levubu rivers. The body's spectral type and rotation period are still poorly determined.

Orbit and classification 

Pafuri is a non-family asteroid from the main belt's background population. It orbits the Sun in the outer main-belt at a distance of 2.7–3.6 AU once every 5 years and 6 months (2,023 days; semi-major axis of 3.13 AU). Its orbit has an eccentricity of 0.14 and an inclination of 9° with respect to the ecliptic.

Naming 

This minor planet was named after the river in the Pafuri Triangle, created by the confluence of the Limpopo and Levubu rivers in South Africa. The official naming citation was mentioned in The Names of the Minor Planets by Paul Herget in 1955.

Physical characteristics 

In the SMASS classification, Pafuri is an X-type asteroid, while the Wide-field Infrared Survey Explorer (WISE) characterized it as a primitive and darker P-type asteroid. The Collaborative Asteroid Lightcurve Link assumes it to be a carbonaceous C-type asteroid.

Rotation period 

In November 2009, a rotational lightcurve of Pafuri was obtained from photometric observations by French amateur astronomer Pierre Antonini who suspects it to be a slow rotator. Lightcurve analysis gave a rotation period of at least 24 hours with a brightness variation of more than 0.15 magnitude. The result supersedes a previous period of at least 13 hours at the Oakley Observatory in the United States. As of 2018, no secure rotation period has been obtained.

Diameter and albedo 

According to the surveys carried out by the Infrared Astronomical Satellite IRAS, the Japanese Akari satellite and the NEOWISE mission of NASA's WISE telescope, Pafuri measures between 54.67 and 75.265 kilometers in diameter and its surface has an albedo between 0.0312 and 0.0591. CALL derives an albedo of 0.0540 and a diameter of 54.61 kilometers based on an absolute magnitude of 10.1.

References

External links 
 Lightcurve Database Query (LCDB), at www.minorplanet.info
 Dictionary of Minor Planet Names, Google books
 Asteroids and comets rotation curves, CdR – Geneva Observatory, Raoul Behrend
 Discovery Circumstances: Numbered Minor Planets (1)-(5000) – Minor Planet Center
 
 

001032
Discoveries by Harry Edwin Wood
Named minor planets
001032
19240530